In physics, the C parity or charge parity is a multiplicative quantum number of some particles that describes their behavior under the symmetry operation of charge conjugation.

Charge conjugation changes the sign of all quantum charges (that is, additive quantum numbers), including the electrical charge, baryon number and lepton number, and the flavor charges strangeness, charm, bottomness, topness and Isospin (I3). In contrast, it doesn't affect the mass, linear momentum or spin of a particle.

Formalism
Consider an operation  that transforms a particle into its antiparticle,

Both states must be normalizable, so that

which implies that  is unitary, 

By acting on the particle twice with the  operator,

Putting this all together, we see that 

meaning that the charge conjugation operator is Hermitian and therefore a physically observable quantity.

Eigenvalues
For the eigenstates of charge conjugation,
.

As with parity transformations, applying  twice must leave the particle's state unchanged,

allowing only eigenvalues of  the so-called C-parity or charge parity of the particle.

Eigenstates
The above implies that for eigenstates, .

Multiparticle systems
For a system of free particles, the C parity is the product of C parities for each particle.

In a pair of bound mesons there is an additional component due to the orbital angular momentum. For example, in a bound state of two pions, π+ π− with an orbital angular momentum L, exchanging π+ and π− inverts the relative position vector, which is identical to a parity operation. Under this operation, the angular part of the spatial wave function contributes a phase factor of (−1)L, where L is the angular momentum quantum number associated with L.
.
With a two-fermion system, two extra factors appear: one comes from the spin part of the wave function, and the second from the exchange of a fermion by its antifermion.

Bound states can be described with the spectroscopic notation 2S+1LJ (see term symbol), where S is the total spin quantum number, L the total orbital momentum quantum number and J the total angular momentum quantum number. 
Example: the positronium is a bound state electron-positron similar to a hydrogen atom. The parapositronium and orthopositronium correspond to the states 1S0 and 3S1. 
 With S = 0 spins are anti-parallel, and with S = 1 they are parallel. This gives a multiplicity (2S+1) of 1 or 3, respectively
 The total orbital angular momentum quantum number is L = 0 (S, in spectroscopic notation)
 Total angular momentum quantum number is J = 0, 1
 C parity ηC = (−1)L + S = +1, −1, respectively. Since charge parity is preserved, annihilation of these states in photons (ηC(γ) = −1) must be:
{|
|-
|
| 1S0 || → || γ + γ 
|          
| 3S1 || → || γ + γ + γ
|-
| ηC:
| +1 || = || (−1) × (−1) 
|
| −1 || = || (−1) × (−1) × (−1)
|}

Experimental tests of C-parity conservation
 : The neutral pion, is observed to decay to two photons,γ+γ. We can infer that the pion therefore has , but each additional γ introduces a factor of -1 to the overall C parity of the pion. The decay to 3γ would violate C parity conservation. A search for this decay was conducted using pions created in the reaction .
: Decay of the Eta meson.
 annihilations

See also
G-parity

References

Quantum mechanics
Quantum field theory